John L. Lawrence (October 2, 1785 – July 24, 1849) was an American lawyer, diplomat, and politician from New York.

Early life
John was born in New York City.  He was the son of Jonathan Lawrence (1737–1812), a merchant and New York State Senator, and Ruth (née Riker) Lawrence (1746–1818), a member of the Riker family, for whom Rikers Island is named. Among his siblings were brothers  Samuel Lawrence (1773–1837), a Congressmen, and William T. Lawrence (1788–1859).

He was also a direct descendant of Capt. James Lawrence, a hero of the War of 1812, and Maj. Thomas Lawrence of the British Army who received a land grant in 1656 in what became Queens.

He graduated from Columbia College in 1803.

Career
From June 7, 1814, to May 19, 1815, he was Chargé d'Affaires at Stockholm, representing the United States during the absence of Minister to Sweden Jonathan Russell.

He was a member of the New York State Assembly (New York Co.) in 1816–17. He was a delegate to the New York State Constitutional Convention of 1821.

He was a presidential elector in 1840, voting for William Henry Harrison and John Tyler.

He was a member of the New York State Senate (4th D.) in 1848 and 1849. In May 1849, he was appointed New York City Comptroller, but died two months later.

Personal life
On June 2, 1816, he married Sarah Augusta Smith (1794–1877), daughter of Elizabeth (née Woodhull) Smith (daughter of Gen. Nathaniel Woodhull) and General John Tangier Smith, a U.S. Representative and U.S. Senator from New York.  Together, John and Sarah were the parents of eleven children, including Abraham Riker Lawrence, a Justice of the Supreme Court of New York.

Lawrence died of cholera in New York City on July 24, 1849.

References

External links

1785 births
1849 deaths
Members of the New York State Assembly
New York (state) state senators
New York (state) Whigs
19th-century American politicians
New York (state) Democratic-Republicans
Politicians from New York City
19th-century American diplomats
Columbia College (New York) alumni
1840 United States presidential electors
Deaths from cholera
Lawyers from New York City
19th-century American lawyers